Erik Holm (7 January 1912 – 28 July 1999) was a Swedish water polo player. He competed at the 1936 Summer Olympics, the 1948 Summer Olympics and the 1952 Summer Olympics.

References

1912 births
1999 deaths
Swedish male water polo players
Olympic water polo players of Sweden
Water polo players at the 1936 Summer Olympics
Water polo players at the 1948 Summer Olympics
Water polo players at the 1952 Summer Olympics
Sportspeople from Stockholm